"Justified" is a song by American country music artist Kacey Musgraves. It was released on August 27, 2021, as the lead single from Musgraves' fifth studio album, Star-Crossed, released on September 10, 2021. Musgraves co-wrote the song with Ilsey Juber, BJ Burton and Ian Fitchuk, and produced it with Fitchuk and Daniel Tashian.

Content
In an interview with Elle in May 2021, Musgraves talked about the inspiration for the song, her divorce with Ruston Kelly: "I felt, in many ways, on top of the world in my career, but in my personal life, I felt like I was dying inside. I was crumbling. I was sad. I felt lonely. I felt broken." 

Matt Doria of NME pointed out that the song "serve[s] as a poignant reflection on Musgraves' divorce from country singer Ruston Kelly". Andy Sahadeo of Nicki Swift described the song as "a somber contemplation of the singer's personal life over the past few years".

Critical reception
Jason Friedman of Paste felt that the track "recalls some of the warmth of previous album Golden Hour, with the track serving as an uptempo reminder that 'healing doesn't happen in a straight line,' as the singer wrestles with the different mood cycles that follow a breakup."

Music video
The music video was directed by Bardia Zeinali, and taken from the film Star-Crossed. The video begins with Musgraves "driving solemnly through a desert while listening to a commercial on love counseling from the car radio". She drives through "different environments and weather, likes a green-lit tunnel, a snowy forest, rain, an urban city, and an autumn highway".

Commercial performance
"Justified" debuted at number 31 on the Billboard Hot Country Songs chart dated September 11, 2021. After the album was released, it climbed to number 22 on the chart dated September 25, 2021.

Live performance
On October 2, 2021, Musgraves performed the song on the 47th season of Saturday Night Live.

Charts

Release history

References

2021 songs
2021 singles
Kacey Musgraves songs
Songs written by Kacey Musgraves
Songs written by Ilsey Juber
Songs written by BJ Burton
MCA Nashville Records singles
Interscope Records singles
Song recordings produced by Daniel Tashian
Song recordings produced by Ian Fitchuk
Songs written by Ian Fitchuk